Manitoba 100 was a Canadian historical documentary television miniseries which aired on CBC Television in 1970.

Premise
This five-episode series was produced in Winnipeg as a project for Manitoba's provincial centennial. Maurice Burchell was its narrator.

Scheduling
The half-hour episodes were broadcast on Fridays at 11:25 p.m. (Eastern) from 17 July to 14 August 1970, and rebroadcast on Thursdays at 10:00 a.m. from 13 August to 10 September 1970.

Episodes
 "A Blot On The Horizon" recounted the earliest exploration of the Manitoba region
 "New Horizons" featured the region's settlement including the Hudson's Bay fur trade in which English and French were rivals
 "Tarnished Sunset" described the 1870 establishment of Manitoba as a Canadian province
 "Destiny" covered Manitoba's first 40 years as a province
 "Boom Or Bust" was an overview Manitoba's history after 1910

References

External links
 

CBC Television original programming
1970 Canadian television series debuts
1970 Canadian television series endings
Television shows filmed in Winnipeg